The 2012 AFC Cup knockout stage was contested by a total of 16 teams (10 from West Asia Zone and 6 from East Asia Zone). They included the 8 group winners and the 8 group runners-up from the group stage.

Each round of this single-elimination tournament was played over one or two matches. In the round of 16, each tie was played as one match, hosted by the winners of each group against the runners-up of another group. In the quarter-finals and semi-finals, each tie was played over two legs on a home-and-away basis. The final was hosted by one of the finalists, decided by draw. The away goals rule (for two-legged ties), extra time (away goals do not apply in extra time) and penalty shootout would be used to decide the winner if necessary.

The matchups for the round of 16 were decided based on the results from the group stage. After the completion of the round of 16, the draw for the quarter-finals, semi-finals, and final was held at the AFC house in Kuala Lumpur, Malaysia on 14 June 2012, 15:00 UTC+08:00. In this draw, the "country protection" rule was applied: if there are exactly two clubs from the same country, they may not face each other in the quarter-finals; however, if there are more than two clubs from the same country, they may face each other in the quarter-finals.

Qualified teams

Bracket
While the bracket below shows the entire knockout stage, the draw for the round of 16 matches was determined at the time of the group draw.

The draw for the quarter-finals and beyond was held separately, after the conclusion of the round of 16.

Round of 16
The matches were played 22 and 23 May 2012.

|}

Matches

Notes
Note 1: Due to the political crisis in Syria, the AFC requested Syrian clubs to play their home matches at neutral venues.

Quarter-finals
The first legs were played 18 September 2012, and the second legs were played 25 and 26 September 2012.

|}

First legs

Second legs

Arbil won 6–2 on aggregate.

Al-Kuwait won 3–0 on aggregate.

Al-Ettifaq won 4–0 on aggregate.

Chonburi won 5–4 on aggregate.

Notes
Note 2: Due to the political crisis in Syria, the AFC requested Syrian clubs to play their home matches at neutral venues.

Semi-finals
The first legs were played 2 October 2012, and the second legs were played 23 October 2012.

|}

First legs

Second legs

Arbil won 8–2 on aggregate.

Al-Kuwait won 6–1 on aggregate.

Final

The final of the 2012 AFC Cup was hosted by one of the finalists, decided by a draw. According to the draw on 14 June 2012, the winner of semi-final 2 would host the final. Therefore, Arbil was the home team.

References

External links
 

Knockout stage